The Lura Lakes are a group of lakes of glacial origin, situated in the eastern Lura Mountains and Lurë National Park in Albania. The lakes are renowned for their distinctive colors, ranging from azure to green, grey or blue.

Currently, 12 lakes can be seen from the surface. The lakes are situated between 1,500 and 1,700 metres elevation above sea level. Each lake carries a name associated with its most characteristic feature.

See also  
 Kunora e Lurës
 Lurë National Park
 Geography of Albania
 Lakes of Albania

References 

 

Geography of Dibër County
Tourist attractions in Dibër County
Lura
Glacial lakes of Albania